SM U-78 was one of the 329 submarines serving in the Imperial German Navy in World War I. U-78 was engaged in the naval warfare and took part in the First Battle of the Atlantic as a minelayer. On 27 October 1918 low frequency communications from U-78 in the Skagerrak were detected by the British submarine  which sank her with the loss of her crew of 40. The commonly listed sinking date of 28 October 1918 is in error.

The wreck has been identified in April 2014.

Original documents from Room 40 
The following is a verbatim transcription of the recorded activities of SM U-78 known to British Naval Intelligence, Room 40 O.B.:

SM U-78.
Kptlt. Vollbrecht. Was completed at Hamburg (Vulcan) in May 1916, joined the Kiel School and remained there until the 8th of July, when she went to Wilhelmshaven, and was attached to the 1st Half Flotilla.
11–27 July 1916. Left for the north. By about the 20th had laid 34 mines off Skerryvore. On the 23rd she was in action with the armed trawler CHRYSEA off Fair Island. Took 1 Danish S.S. as prize on the day before she returned to Heligoland.
20 August – 12 September 1916. Left, going northabout, for the south of Ireland and laid 34 mines off St. Govan’s Head on the night of the 1/2 September, and on the 27th August had chased S.S. FLOREAL off the Butt of Lewis. Returned northabout.
18–23 October 1916. Apparently on North Sea patrol. Stopped 6 Scandinavian S.S, allowing them to proceed. On last day out took as prize a Norwegian steamer.
29 October – 22 November 1916. Apparently went to coast of Norway to observe shipping; sank 1 Norwegian steamer.
3–22 February 1917. Laid mines at various points off the west coast of Scotland, going northabout both ways. Sank 1 steamer N. of Ireland, and possibly another N. of the Orkney Islands.
30 March – 19 April 1917. Went north, and watched the traffic on north coast of Ireland. Sand 3 S.S, 2 sailing vessels (6,500 tons). Laid mines in the Little Minch and Lough Swilly.
29 May – 22 June 1917. Went northabout and laid mines off Inishtrahull, and at points off the N.W. coast of Scotland. Was engaged by HMS HELGOLAND (a submarine trap) near Tory Island on 9 June. Claimed 5,000 tons sinkings. She asked permission to return by Little Belt, but was told for a special reason she must come in by Nordmands Tief.
27 July – 13 August 1917. Laid mines in Sound of Islay. Claimed 2,500 tons sinkings. Returned at slow speed owing to failure of port engine.
She was to have gone out again in October 1917 but nothing is known of any cruise, and she was apparently not ready for service before June 1918.
16 June - ? 27 June 1918. Apparently laid mines east of Scotland.
? 14–21 July 1918. Left by the Kattegat, returned by the Bight. Had completed an unknown task in the North Sea by the 18th July.
? 19 August - ? 26 August 1918. In the North Sea. Made no report as to her undertaking, but returned at 3 knots with double motor trouble.
24 September – 1 October 1918. Laid mines on the east coast of Scotland.
About the end of October 1918 she left to lay mines in the North Sea and was sunk by HM submarine G2 in "

Note: S.S. = Steam Ship; S.V. = Sailing Vessel; northabout, Muckle Flugga, Fair I. = around Scotland; Sound, Belts, Kattegat = via North of Denmark to/from German Baltic ports; Bight = to/from German North Sea ports; success = sinking of ships

Summary of raiding history

See also 
Room 40

References

Notes

Citations

Bibliography

External links
Photos of cruises of German submarine U-54 in 1916-1918.
A 44 min. German film from 1917 about a cruise of the German submarine U-35.

Room 40:  original documents, photos and maps about World War I German submarine warfare and British Room 40 Intelligence from The National Archives, Kew, Richmond, UK.
Danish diver found U-78, Jyllands-Posten. Video of discovery

World War I submarines of Germany
1915 ships
U-boats commissioned in 1916
Ships built in Hamburg
U-boats sunk in 1918
U-boats sunk by British submarines
German Type UE I submarines
Ships lost with all hands
Maritime incidents in 1918